National Secondary Route 144, or just Route 144 (or ) is a National Road Route of Costa Rica, located in the Puntarenas province.

Description
In Puntarenas province the route covers Montes de Oro canton (Miramar, San Isidro districts).

References

Highways in Costa Rica